The Swiss League is the second tier of the main professional ice hockey league in Switzerland, behind the National League. The winners of the league each season plays a best-of-seven series against the bottom team of the NL, and if they win, they are promoted, while the National League team is relegated to the Swiss League.

Prior to the 2017–18 season, the league was formerly called National League B.  The league attendance in 2018–19 was about 2,700 spectators.

Current teams

Former Teams
Forward-Morges HC - withdrawal at the end of the 2005–06 season
EHC Biel - promoted to National League A after the 2007–08 season
EHC Chur - withdrawal at the end of the 2007–08 season
Lausanne HC - promoted to National League A after the 2012–13 season
SCL Tigers - promoted to National League A after the 2014–15 season
HC Red Ice - bankruptcy after the 2016–17 season
SC Rapperswil-Jona Lakers - promoted to National League after the 2017–18 season
HC Ajoie - promoted to the National League following the 2020-21 season
EHC Kloten - promoted to the National League at the end of the 2021-22 season
SC Langenthal - will withdraw from professional hockey at the end of the 2022-23 season

See also
National League
MySports League
Swiss 1. Liga

References

External links
Swiss Ice Hockey, official site - in French and German
Puck.ch Results of Swiss Ice Hockey - in English, French, German and Italian*

 
Swiss
Professional ice hockey leagues in Switzerland